The Gyalpozhing College of Information Technology(GCIT) (Dzongkha: རྒྱལ་པོའི་ཞིང་བརྡ་དོན་འཕྲུལ་རིག་མཐོ་རིམ་སློབ་གྲྭ་; Wylie: 'brug rgyal-'dzin gtsug-lag-slob-sde), was established on February 2, 2017 in Mongar, Bhutan, as part of the Royal University of Bhutan. The college currently offers a Bachelor of Computer Applications programme.

References

External links 
 

Colleges in Bhutan